The Manukwari blind snake (Ramphotyphlops similis) is a species of snake in the Typhlopidae family.

References

Ramphotyphlops
Reptiles described in 1934